The 1974 Grand Prix German Open was a combined men's and women's tennis tournament played on outdoor red clay courts. It was the 66th edition of the event and was part of the 1974 Commercial Union Assurance Grand Prix circuit. It took place at the Am Rothenbaum in Hamburg, West Germany, from 20 May through 26 May 1974. Third-seeded Eddie Dibbs won the singles title.

Finals

Men's singles
 Eddie Dibbs defeated  Hans-Joachim Plötz 6–2, 6–2, 6–3

Women's singles
 Helga Masthoff defeated  Martina Navratilova 6–4, 5–7, 7–3

Men's doubles
 Jürgen Fassbender /  Hans-Jürgen Pohmann defeated  Brian Gottfried /  Raúl Ramírez 6–3, 6–4, 6–4

Women's doubles
 Helga Hösl /  Raquel Giscafré defeated  Martina Navratilova /  Renáta Tomanová 6–3, 6–2

Mixed doubles
 Heide Orth /  Jürgen Fassbender defeated  Katja Ebbinghaus / Hans-Jürgen Pohmann 7–6, 6–3

References

External links
  
   
 Association of Tennis Professionals (ATP) tournament profile
 International Tennis Federation (ITF) tournament edition details

German Open
Hamburg European Open
1974 in West German sport
1974 in German tennis